Miami 7 (known as S Club 7 in Miami in the U.S.) is a television series starring English pop group S Club 7. Thirteen episodes are produced and aired on CBBC from 8 April to 1 July 1999. During each episode, the members would perform one of the songs from their first album S Club. All seven members of the group star as fictionalised versions of themselves. It is created and partially written by Kim Fuller (brother of the band's manager), who also created and wrote the Spice Girls' 1997 film Spice World.

Renamed as S Club 7 in Miami, the show broadcast in the United States on Fox Family (now Freeform) from 1999 until 2002. In foreign countries, it also aires on VRAK.TV, MusiquePlus and BBC Kids in Canada and Nickelodeon in Latin America.

Plot
The show saw the group (such as Bradley, Rachel, Paul, and Hannah), desperate to make it big, offered a chance for success in Miami by their management. Instead, the gang find themselves working in a hotel for Howard and Marvin Borlotti and entertaining the guests of the hotel. They learn to deal with the culture shock of being in a new country and eventually enjoy and somewhat become accustomed to what America has to offer.

Recurring elements
The group would always sing one of their songs at the end of every episode, with the exception of episode two where the group sing "Tie a Yellow Ribbon" and episode eleven where they sing "Dancing Queen", which was recorded for the Abbamania soundtrack.

Cast

Main
 Hannah Spearritt as Hannah
 Paul Cattermole as Paul
 Tina Cashmore as Tina 
 Rachel Stevens as Rachel 
 Bradley McIntosh as Bradley
 Jo "Joanne" O'Meara as Jo
 Jon "Jonathan" Lee as Jon
 Alfie Wise as Howard Borlotti
 Paul Louis as Marvin Borlotti

Recurring
 Gary Whelan as Danny Parsons
 Tyler Cravens as Rayland Crowe
 Tom Nowicki as Director
 Richard Braine as Magician
 Barry Brandt as Police Officer
 Regina Freedman as Secretary
 Cathy Dennis as Jill Ward

Episodes

Specials

Telecast and home release
Miami 7 was aired on CBBC in the United Kingdom from 8 April until 1 July 1999 with repeats until 2002. The series was also repeated on channels such as Play UK and Disney Channel.

The show was renamed as S Club 7 in Miami, was taken to America where it aired on Fox Family (now Freeform) from 1999 to 2002. In foreign countries, It also aired on VRAK.TV, MusiquePlus and BBC Kids in Canada and Nickelodeon in Latin America.

Miami 7 was released on PAL video in 2000. It was released both as three individual cassettes or in a "Complete Boxset" containing all thirteen episodes. The first two volumes were also released on NTSC video however the third volume (containing the final six episodes) was never released. Also along with the L.A. 7 and Hollywood 7 series, it was never released on DVD until 20 years later. The NTSC version also contained bonus scenes and extra footage.

Ratings
The show was watched by 90 million viewers in over 100 countries.

In 2002, the dates were:
Tuesday 19 February – 60,000

Thursday 21 February – 70,000

References

External links

1990s British children's television series
1999 British television series debuts
1999 British television series endings
S Club 7 television series
BBC children's television shows
Disney Channel original programming
British children's musical television series
Television series about teenagers
Television shows set in Miami
Fox Family Channel original programming
Television series based on singers and musicians
Television series by Endemol